The Joint Combat Pistol was the name for a former US program for a new military sidearm to replace the M9 Pistol, extant from late 2005 to early 2006. The program was started in 2005 and run by USSOCOM.  It was the result of a merger of two earlier programs, the army's Future Handgun System (FHS) and the Special Operations Forces Combat Pistol. Requirements for the JCP included being chambered for caliber .45 ACP, having an integrated Picatinny rail, including day/night sights, and being capable of accepting a suppressor.

On March 10, 2006 a modification to the earlier request was made, changing the name from Joint Combat Pistol to Combat Pistol. The number of pistols sought was reduced from 645,000 handguns to 50,000. This effectively reverted to the SOF Combat Pistol program in terms of its scale, as the army dropped its participation. In the autumn of 2006, the Combat Pistol (CP) program was suspended indefinitely.

In a 2007 supplemental session, the congressional defense sub-committee appropriated $5 million to a Joint Combat Pistol study.

Background 
A cross-service US military sidearm is a notable event in that there have been only two major adoption programs over a 100-year span of military history.  While new sidearms were adopted at a fairly steady pace in the late 19th century, the 20th century yielded only the M1911 (the result of a 1900 program) and the M9 (the result of a 1980s program, the Joint Service Small Arms Program). The previous adoption took over a decade, involved several acts of Congress and multiple lawsuits, and stirred up great controversy. The short-lived JCP program was not an exception, only surviving a few months before being drastically scaled back and renamed. Its successor, the Combat Pistol program fared even worse, being halted just a few months later.

Overview of 2005 JCP solicitation 
This was based on original solicitation, which was later modified, and finally, heavily changed in March 2006, with the program renamed to Combat Pistol.

 The notice starts: The USSOCOM intends to issue a solicitation to obtain commercially available non-developmental item (NDI) Joint Combat Pistol (JCP) system, Caliber .45 (ACP). 
 Two configurations required: One with no external safety and the other configuration will have an external safety.
The 'Combat Pistol System' is to consist of:
a Caliber .45 pistol  (designed for A475 and AA18 rounds)
Magazines (standard and high-capacity);
Suppressor Attachment Kit
Holster
Magazine Holder (standard and high-capacity)
Cleaning Kit and Operator's Manual.
Estimates for max procurement quantities for the system are listed as
45,000 no external safety
600,000 JCP with the external safety configuration
649,000 Holsters
96,050 Standard Capacity Magazines
192,099 High Capacity Magazines
667,000 Magazine Holders
132,037 Suppressor attachment kits

While this is the max procurement, in comparison the initial order for M9 pistols was for 300,000 pistols (followed by more later).

Timeline
A Q&A listed the following projected dates:
Final RFP Release:  Projected in January 2006
Proposal Response Deadline:  Projected in March 2006
Expected Contract Award Date:  Projected in 4Q FY06.
Projected First Delivery Order date and Quantities: The government will issue the first delivery order at time of award of the basic contract.  Currently IDIQ minimum quantity is 12 each JCPs without external manual safety which will be awarded as the initial Delivery Order.

JCP and CP candidates
A large variety of .45 ACP pistols were entered into the competition. These include the:

 Beretta PX4 Storm
 Fabrique Nationale FNP45-USG
 Glock 21SF
 Heckler & Koch HK45C
 Para-Ordnance LDA 1911
 Ruger P345
 SIG P220 Combat
 Smith & Wesson M&P
 HS-45 (sold as the Springfield Armory XD in the United States)
 Taurus PT 24/7 OSS

See also 
 Individual Carbine
 List of individual weapons of the U.S. Armed Forces
 XM8 rifle
 XM17 Modular Handgun System competition

Notes

External links 
 Solicitation for Joint Combat Pistol (JCP) system 
 Sources Sought for SOF Combat Pistol
 FHS data sheet (PDF format)
 Federal Business Opportunities links
 Army Times article on handgun testing (not JCP testing)

Semi-automatic pistols of the United States
Weapons of the United States